Yangthang Assembly constituency is one of the 32 assembly constituencies of Sikkim a north east state of India. Yangthang is part of Sikkim Lok Sabha constituency.

Members of Legislative Assembly
 2009: Prem Lall Subba, Sikkim Democratic Front
 2014: Chandra Maya Limboo (Subba), Sikkim Democratic Front

Election results

2019

See also
 West Sikkim district
 List of constituencies of Sikkim Legislative Assembly

References

Assembly constituencies of Sikkim
Gyalshing district